Håkon Evjen (born 14 February 2000) is a Norwegian professional footballer who plays as a midfielder for Danish Superliga club Brøndby IF.

Club career
Evjen started out playing with his hometown club, FK Mjølner, before moving to Bodø/Glimt with his brother in 2016.

After a year with the youth team, Evjen signed his first professional contract with Bodø/Glimt in August 2017. He made his debut on 22 October, replacing Jens Petter Hauge during a First Division win against Jerv.

On 17 September 2019, Bodø/Glimt announced Evjen would be leaving for AZ Alkmaar on 1 January 2020. He signed a four and a half year contract with the club.

On 17 January 2023, Evjen joined Danish Superliga side Brøndby IF for an undisclosed fee, signing a contract until June 2027 with the club.

International career
Evjen represented the national under-17 team at the 2017 UEFA European Under-17 Championship. He made two appearances in the qualifying tournament, scoring once in a draw with Russia. He went on to play twice in the finals.

Evjen played in all three matches of the Norwegian U-20 team during the 2019 FIFA U-20 World Cup.

Personal life
Evjen is the son of former footballer Andreas Evjen, who captained Bodø/Glimt in the 1990s. His twin brother, Henrik, currently plays in the FK Mjølner youth system, where their father coaches.

Career statistics

Club

Honours
Bodø/Glimt
1. divisjon: 2017

Individual
Eliteserien Player of the Year: 2019
Eliteserien Young Player of the Year: 2019

References

External links
 
 
 
 

2000 births
Living people
People from Narvik
Norwegian footballers
Norway youth international footballers
Norway under-21 international footballers
Norway international footballers
Association football midfielders
FK Mjølner players
FK Bodø/Glimt players
AZ Alkmaar players
Eliteserien players
Norwegian First Division players
Norwegian Second Division players
Norwegian Third Division players
Eredivisie players
Norwegian expatriate footballers
Expatriate footballers in the Netherlands
Norwegian expatriate sportspeople in the Netherlands
Twin sportspeople
Norwegian twins
Sportspeople from Nordland